The 2003–04 season of the NOFV-Oberliga was the tenth season of the league at tier four (IV) of the German football league system.

The NOFV-Oberliga was split into two divisions, NOFV-Oberliga Nord and NOFV-Oberliga Süd. The champions of each, Hertha BSC II and VFC Plauen, entered into a play-off against each other for the right to play in the 2004–05 Regionalliga Nord. Hertha BSC II won 6–5 over two legs and thus gained promotion.

North

Top goalscorers

South

Top goalscorers

External links 
 NOFV-Online – official website of the North-East German Football Association 

NOFV-Oberliga seasons
4
Germ